Sandanski Municipality is a municipality in Blagoevgrad Province in Southwestern Bulgaria.

Demographics

Religion 
According to the latest Bulgarian census of 2011, the religious composition, among those who answered the optional question on religious identification, was the following:

References

External links

Municipalities in Blagoevgrad Province